Roy Sherman (August 31, 1909 - October 20, 1968) was an American racing driver and car builder.

As a driver, won many races and titles in midget cars. He was inducted into the National Midget Auto Racing Hall of Fame in 2004.

World Championship Indianapolis 500 results

References

1909 births
1968 deaths
American racing drivers
American racecar constructors
Formula One constructors (Indianapolis only)